The common nightingale is a songbird found in Eurasia.

Nightingale may also refer to:

Birds 
 Thrush nightingale, a songbird found in Eurasia
 Red-billed leiothrix, a songbird of the Indian Subcontinent

Literature
 "Nightingale" (short story), a short story by Alastair Reynolds, in the 2006 collection Galactic North
 "The Nightingale" (fairy tale), an 1843 fairy tale by Hans Christian Andersen
 The Nightingale (Turnbull novel), a novel by Agnes Sligh Turnbull
 Nightingale the Robber, a character in Russian folklore
 The Nightingale: A Conversation Poem, a 1798 poem by Samuel Taylor Coleridge
 The Nightingale, a 1988 novel by Kara Dalkey
 The Nightingale (journal), the first nursing journal published in 1886; see Nursing literature
 The Nightingale (Pinkney book), a 2002 children's picture book by Jerry Pinkney
 The Nightingale (Hannah novel), a work of historical fiction by Kristin Hannah
The Nightingales, a 2018 play by William Gaminara

Music
 "The Nightingale", Op.60 No.4 setting of a poem by Pushkin by Tchaikovsky
 Nightingale (ballet), a 1940 Russian ballet composed by M. Kroshner and choreographed by Aleksey Yermolayev
 Nightingale (musical), a 1982 stage musical by Charles Strouse
 The Nightingale (opera), a 1914 opera by Igor Stravinsky
 Song of the Nightingale, a 1917 symphonic poem adapted by Igor Stravinsky from the opera
 The Nightingale, a composition by James B. Adams
 The Nightingale (musical), a stage musical by Steven Sater and Duncan Sheik

Performers
 Nightingale (band), a Swedish rock band
 The Nightingales, a British post-punk band
 The Dixie Nightingales or The Nightingales, a 1958–1972 African-American male vocal group
 Jacks (band), originally Nightingale, a 1960s Japanese psychedelic rock group
 Nightingales, a Norwegian vocal quartet including Christine Guldbrandsen

Albums
 Nightingale (Erland and the Carnival album), 2011
 Nightingale (George Adams album), 1989
 Nightingale (Yoshikazu Mera album), 1998
 Nightingale, by Gilberto Gil, 1979

Songs
 "The Nightingale" (Alyabyev), an 1825 song composed by Alexander Alyabyev
 "Nightingale" (Carole King song), 1974
 "Nightingale" (Demi Lovato song), 2013
 "Nightingale", by Band-Maid from Unseen World
 "Nightingale", by the Eagles from The Eagles
 "Nightingale", by Lisa Ekdahl from Sings Salvadore Poe
 "Nightingale", by Norah Jones from Come Away with Me
 "Nightingale", by Oscar Peterson from Tristeza on Piano
 "Nightingale", by Roxy Music from Siren
 "Nightingale", by Saves the Day from Stay What You Are
 "Nightingale", by Yanni from Tribute
 "The Nightingale", by Angelo Badalamenti from Soundtrack from Twin Peaks
 "Nightingales", by Prefab Sprout from From Langley Park to Memphis
 "Nightingales" (song), a 1944 song by Vasily Solovyov-Sedoi

People 
 Nightingale (surname), including a list of people with the name
 Nightingale baronets, a title in the Baronetage of England
 K. S. Chithra (born 1963), Indian playback singer and carnatic musician known as "Nightingale of South India"
 Jenny Lind (1820–1887), Swedish opera singer known as "Swedish Nightingale"
 Sarojini Naidu (1879–1949), Indian independence activist and poet known as "Nightingale of India"

Places 
 Nightingale, Alberta, Canada, a hamlet
 Nightingale Corona, a large corona on Venus
 Nightingale Islands, a group of three islands in the South Atlantic Ocean
 Nightingale Island, an island in the group
 Nightingale Mountains, a range in Nevada, U.S.
 Nightingale Valley, a geological site near Portishead, North Somerset, England, UK

Facilities and structures
 Nightingale Academy, now AIM North London Academy, a secondary school in Edmonton, London, England
 Nightingale College, Salt Lake City, Utah
 Nightingale Estate, a social housing estate in Hackney, London, England
 Nightingale Hospitals, seven temporary COVID-19 hospitals in England
 Nightingale House, a historic Victorian-era home in San Francisco, California, U.S.
 Nightingale Primary School, a school in Wood Green, London, England
 Nightingale–Olympic, a shopping mall in Bangkok, Thailand

Television and film

Television
 Miss Nightingale (1974), British TV biopic starring Janet Suzman
 Nightingales (British TV series), a 1990–1993 sitcom
 Nightingales (American TV series), a 1989 medical drama
 "Nightingale" (Star Trek: Voyager), an episode of Star Trek: Voyager

Film
 The Nightingale (1914 film), a silent film starring Ethel Barrymore in her screen debut
 The Nightingale (1936 film), a Soviet drama film
 The Nightingale (2013 film), a Chinese-French film
 Nightingale (film), a 2014 American film
 The Nightingale (2018 film), an Australian film
 The Nightingale (upcoming film), an American film

Vehicles

Aircraft
 C-9A Nightingale or McDonnell Douglas C-9, a United States Air Force aircraft
 C-70 Nightingale, a variant of the Howard DGA-15 flown by the U.S. Army Air Forces

Ships
  HMS Nightingale (1805), a Seagull class brig-sloop of the British Royal Navy
 SS Nightingale, a number of ships with this name
 USS Nightingale, a number of ships with this name

Other uses
 Czech Nightingale, Czech music award
 Nightingale (software), a media player for Linux, Windows, and Mac
 Nachtigall Battalion (Nightingale Battalion), a Ukrainian battle command under German command in World War II
 Nightingale Informatix Corporation, a company headquartered in Markham, Ontario, Canada
 Operation Nightingale, a Singaporean Armed Forces humanitarian operation during the Gulf War
 Operation Nightingale (United States), a recruiting campaign for nurses during the Vietnam War
 Operation Nightingale. a UK project which uses archaeology to aid the recovery of service personnel injured in conflict
 Project Nightingale, a Google Cloud and Ascension health data storage and processing project

See also

 Nightingale Hospital (disambiguation)
 Florence Nightingale (disambiguation)
 Nightingale ward, a type of hospital ward
 
 Philomel (disambiguation), a figure in western literature identified with the nightingale